Choquetacarpo (possibly from Quechua chuqi metal, every kind of precious metal / gold (<Aymara), takarpu nail /  stake, "metal nail" or "metal stake") is a  high mountain in the Vilcabamba mountain range in the Andes of Peru. It is located in the Cusco Region, La Convención Province, in the districts Santa Teresa and Vilcabamba. Choquetacarpo lies northwest of the Pumasillo peak. The little river Moyoc (Muyuq) originates east of the mountain. It flows to the south as an affluent of the Yanama River.

See also 
 Padreyoc

References

Mountains of Peru
Mountains of Cusco Region